The 2016 Vietnam floods affected central Vietnam, resulting in estimated 27.000 thousands of homes entirely submerged by rising water. Meteorologists cited the 2016 Asian monsoon, among the strongest in years, and the El Niño as the cause. The last time the area was heavily flooded was during the 2008 Vietnam floods.

Impact 
At least 13 people have died, following the flooding.

See also
Typhoon Sarika (2016)
2008 Vietnam floods

References

https://vietnam.oxfam.org/

External links
Photos with englisch information (October 15, 2016) 
Extreme Vietnam Floods Footage Compilation 2016 (October 14, 2016)

2016 floods in Asia
Floods
2016
October 2016 events in Asia